Bruhanja Vas is a settlement in the Municipality of Dobrepolje in Slovenia. It lies in the karst field south of Videm. The area is part of the traditional region of Lower Carniola. The municipality is now included in the Central Slovenia Statistical Region.

Name
Bruhanja Vas was attested in historical sources as Guetenueld  in 1343, Mükendorff in 1436, Fleygendorff in 1463, and Veigundarff in 1484, among other names and spellings.

Gallery

References

External links
Bruhanja Vas on Geopedia

Populated places in the Municipality of Dobrepolje